Queendom may refer to:

Queendom (album), a 1986 album by Show-Ya
Queendom (Awich album), 2022 album
Queendom, a 2004 album by Pushim
Queendom, a 2010 album by Ali Project
"Queendom", a 2018 song by Aurora from Infections of a Different Kind (Step 1)
Queendom (TV series), a 2019 South Korean television series
Queendom (EP), a 2021 extended play by Red Velvet
"Queendom" (song), a 2021 song by Red Velvet from the extended play of the same title
"Queendom", a 2022 promotional single by Awich from the album of the same title